The 2009 Fergana Challenger was a professional tennis tournament played on outdoor hard courts. It was part of the 2009 ATP Challenger Tour. It took place in Fergana, Uzbekistan between May 18 and May 23, 2009.

Singles entrants

Seeds

Rankings are as of May 11, 2009.

Other entrants
The following players received wildcards into the singles main draw:
  Rifat Biktyakov
  Murad Inoyatov
  Sergei Shipilov
  Vaja Uzakov

The following players received entry from the qualifying draw:
  Evgeny Kirillov
  Purav Raja
  Artem Sitak
  Kittipong Wachiramanowong

Champions

Singles

 Lukáš Lacko vs  Samuel Groth, 4–6, 7–5, 7–6(4)

Doubles

 Pavel Chekhov /  Alexey Kedryuk vs  Pierre-Ludovic Duclos /  Aisam-ul-Haq Qureshi, 4–6, 6–3, [10–5]

References

External links
Official website
ITF search 

Fergana Challenger
Fergana Challenger